Leon Dołżycki (20 March 1888 – 20 September 1965) was a Polish painter. His work was part of the painting event in the art competition at the 1928 Summer Olympics.

References

1888 births
1965 deaths
20th-century Polish painters
20th-century Polish male artists
Olympic competitors in art competitions
Artists from Lviv
Polish male painters